Earle & Fisher was an American architectural partnership active during 1892–1903.  It was a partnership of Clellan W. Fisher and Stephen C. Earle (1839-1913).  Fisher became a Fellow of the American Institute of Architects in 1893.

A number of its works are listed on the National Register of Historic Places.

Works by either Fisher or by the partnership include;
Bancroft Tower, Bancroft Tower Rd., Worcester, Massachusetts (Earle & Fisher), NRHP-listed
IOOF Building, 674 Main St., Worcester, Massachusetts (Fisher, Clellan W.), NRHP-listed
Providence Street Firehouse, 98 Providence St., Worcester, Massachusetts (Earle & Fisher), NRHP-listed
South Unitarian Church, 888 Main St., Worcester, Massachusetts (Earle & Fisher), NRHP-listed
St. Matthews, 693 Southbridge St., Worcester, Massachusetts (Earle & Fisher; Earle, Stephen), NRHP-listed
Union Congregational Church, 5 Chestnut St., Worcester, Massachusetts (Earle & Fisher), NRHP-listed
One or more works in Washburn Square-Leicester Common Historic District, Main St., Washburn Sq., 3 Paxton St., Leicester, Massachusetts (Earle & Fisher), NRHP-listed

References

Architecture firms based in Massachusetts